One Last Stop is a 2021 LGBT romance novel written by American author Casey McQuiston. The novel is about a woman named August Landry, a cynical pseudo detective, who finds love in a woman she meets on a subway named Jane Su, a punk Lesbian from the 1970s who has been misplaced in time and is trapped on the subway.

Background 
One Last Stop is Casey Mcquiston's second published novel. They write Queer romance New adult fiction novels. In terms of the time travel aspect of the book, McQuiston was inspired by Outlander (TV series). In an interview for Insider they said they were inspired to set the story on a subway because they see "public transit as a liminal space where your life crosses paths with another person's life like five million times for half a second."

Plot 
August Landry is a Bisexual 23-year-old woman who moves to New York City in order to forget her old life. She is very cynical and is determined to leave everyone from her old life behind. August is a closed-off individual who does not believe in love or friendship. She is also looking to move on from her mother's obsessive search for her missing uncle that has consumed all of August's life. In New York City, she finds roommates who are also members of the Queer community. She gets a job at a restaurant called Pancake Billy's House of Pancakes. On her way to take college classes, she bumps into a woman, Jane, on the subway and develops a crush. As the two get to know each other, Jane reveals that she only knows her name because it was written on the inside of her jacket and that she is actually from the 1970s. August must unearth her detective skills and find a way to get Jane back to her time as well as save Pancake Billy's House of Pancakes from Gentrification, all while learning to be open to people.

Characters

Main characters 

 August Landry is a 23-year-old college student living in New York City. Her love interest is Jane Su. 
 Biyu "Jane" Su is a punk lesbian displaced in her time of the 1970s who is stuck in a subway car. Her love interest is August Landry.
Niko is one of August's roommates. He is a part time psychic medium and part time bartender. His love interest is Myla. 
Myla is one of August's roommates. She is an artist who makes art out of bones. Her love interest is Niko.  
Wes is one of August's roommates. He is a tattoo artist. His love interest is Isaiah.

Minor characters 

 Suzette Landry is August Landry's mother and sister to Augie Landry.
 Augie Landry is uncle to August Landry and long-lost brother to Suzette Landry.
 Isaiah is August's neighbor. He is a Drag queen who goes by the name Annie Depressant. His love interest is Wes.
 Lucie works at Pancake Billy's House of Pancakes.
Jerry works as a fry cook at Pancake Billy's House of Pancakes.

Reception 
Following in the footsteps of their first book, Red, White & Royal Blue, One Last Stop has received positive reviews.NPR writes that "One Last Stop is an electrifying romance that synapses into the dreamy 'Hot Person Summer' kind of story you wish you were a part of." Kirkus Reviews speaks to the aspects of the book that highlight the Queer community, writing "every scene that takes place with August’s chosen family of friends crackles with electricity, warmth, and snappy pop-culture references, whether they’re at a charmingly eccentric 24-hour pancake diner or a drag queen brunch."

One Last Stop was nominated for the Goodreads Choice Awards for best romance novel of 2021 where it placed 3rd. The book has also been placed sixth in the Bookpage top ten romance novels of 2021.

References

American LGBT novels
2021 American novels
St. Martin's Press books